Ride, Red, Ride in Hi-Fi is a 1957 album by jazz trumpeter Henry "Red" Allen. The album was reissued on CD as World on a String.

Track listing
 "Love Is Just Around the Corner" – 5:49
 "Let Me Miss You" – 5:31
 "Ride, Red, Ride" – 4:40
 "I Cover the Waterfront" – 8:25
 "'S Wonderful" (George Gershwin, Ira Gershwin) – 5:29
 "St. James Infirmary" – 3:45
 "Algiers Bounce" – 6:48
 "Love Me or Leave Me" (Walter Donaldson, Gus Kahn) – 5:13
 "I've Got the World on a String" – 5:36
 "Ain't She Sweet" (Milton Ager, Jack Yellen) – 4:08
 "Sweet Lorraine" – 5:34

Personnel
Red Allen – trumpet, vocals
Buster Bailey – clarinet
Coleman Hawkins – tenor saxophone
J. C. Higginbotham – trombone
Everett Barksdale  – guitar
Marty Napoleon – piano
Lloyd Trotman – double bass
Cozy Cole – drums

References

1957 albums
Red Allen albums
RCA Victor albums
Bluebird Records albums
Instrumental albums